The Haji Bektash Veli complex is an Alevi Islamic Cultural Monument of the Republic of Turkey, located in Hacıbektaş, Nevshehir province. It was built in the 13th century as a teqe (dergâh) of the Sufi saint Haji Bektash Veli. After his death, his mausoleum was built here.

Before the secularization of Turkey in 1925, the complex was home to the pir evi ("pir's house") of Haji Bektash Veli, which served as the international headquarters of the Bektashi Order.

Secularization 
Atatürk's 1925 ban on all dervish orders caused the exodus of the Bektashi Order to Albania in 1925, and the complex was closed for religious use. As a result, the administrative seat of the Bektashi Order was shifted to the World Headquarters of the Bektashi in Tirana, Albania in 1930. The Haji Bektash Veli complex was later declared as museum in 1964. The teqe of the complex is thought to be the first "King type" teqe in Turkey.

Tourism 
Nowadays, the Haji Bektash Veli Complex is visited by hundreds of thousands of Alevis, Bektashis, and even Sunni Muslims from Turkey, Albania, and the Turkish diaspora in Europe and around the world. Large festivals are held here every August. Since 2012, the Haji Bektash Veli complex is on the World Heritage Sites Tentative list of the UNESCO.

External links 

 Haji Bektash Veli complex – UNESCO
 The Haji Bektash Veli complex – Ministry of Culture and Tourism (Turkey)

References 

Alevism
Bektashi Order
Museums established in 1964
Tourist attractions in Nevşehir Province
Buildings and structures in Nevşehir Province
Biographical museums in Turkey
Religious museums in Turkey
Sufi shrines
1964 establishments in Turkey
World Heritage Tentative List for Turkey
20th-century religious buildings and structures in Turkey